Gordon Leonard Slater (born 21 November 1971) is a New Zealand former rugby union footballer. He made his debut for the All Blacks in 1997. After having played in 144 matches for Taranaki and with nearly 220 first class games, he bowed out of top rugby at the end of the 2002 season. He was born in New Plymouth.

External links
 Gordon Slater profile at the Rugby Museum

1971 births
New Zealand international rugby union players
People educated at New Plymouth Boys' High School
Living people
New Zealand rugby union players
Rugby union players from New Plymouth
Taranaki rugby union players
Rugby union props